The 1941 Marquette Hilltoppers football team was an American football team that represented Marquette University as an independent during the 1941 college football season. In its first season under head coach Thomas E. Stidham, the team compiled a 4–5 record and outscored opponents by a total of 162 to 151. The team played its home games at Marquette Stadium in Milwaukee.

Senior halfback Jimmy Richardson completed 58 of 91 passes during the 1941 season for a .637 completion percentage. His 58 completed passes was believed to be a new national record for passing efficiency, passing the previous record of .631 set by Oklahoma's Hugh McCullough in 1938.

Marquette's October 25 game against Duquesne drew a crowd of more than 20,000 persons, at that time the largest crowd in Marquette Stadium history.

Schedule

References

Marquette
Marquette Golden Avalanche football seasons
Marquette Hilltoppers football